The Tuborg Stage Image Awards is a televised annual music award presentation in Nepal. The event was first held in 1999. Tuborg Brewery sponsors the awards. The most recent programme included twenty-one different awards.

References

Asian music awards
Nepalese music
Awards established in 1999
1999 establishments in Nepal